Associated motion is a grammatical category whose main function is to associate a motion component to the event expressed by the verbal root.

This category is attested in Pama–Nyungan languages, where it was first discovered (Koch 1984, Wilkins 1991), in Tacanan (Guillaume 2006, 2008, 2009), in rGyalrong languages (Jacques 2013) and in Panoan languages (Tallman 2021).

Languages with associated motion present a contrast between association motion and purposive motion verb constructions, as in the following examples from Japhug Rgyalrong (Jacques 2013:202-3).

Although both examples have the same English translation, they differ in that (2) with the translocative associated motion prefix ɕ- implies that the buying did take place, while (1) with the motion verb does not imply the buying took place, even though the going did. The distinction made by the translocative is similar to the distinction made in "I went and bought things".

References

Bibliography

Koch, Harold. 1984. The category of ‘associated motion’ in Kaytej. Language in Central Australia 1: 23–34.
Tallman, Adam J. R. 2021. Associated Motion in Chácono (Pano) in Typological Perspective. In: Antoine Guillaume, Harold Koch (eds.): Associated Motion. (Empirical Studies in Language). De Gruyter Mouton, p. 419–450.
Wilkins, David P. 1991. The semantics, pragmatics and diachronic development of ‘associated motion’ in Mparntwe Arrernte. Buffalo Papers in Linguistics 1: 207–57.

Grammatical conjugation
Grammatical categories